The Wailing is an upcoming Spanish-French-Argentine horror film directed by Pedro Martín Calero from a screenplay by Martín Calero and Isabel Peña. It stars Ester Expósito, Mathilde Ollivier, and Malena Villa.

Plot 
The plot follows Andrea, haunted by an invisible presence. 20 years before, the same happened to Marie.

Cast

Production 
The screenplay was penned by Pedro Martín-Calero alongside Isabel Peña. The film, Martín-Calero's debut feature, is a Spanish-Argentine-French co-production by Caballo Films, Setembro Cine, Tandem Films, Tarea Fina, Noodles Productions and El llanto AIE, with participation of RTVE and Amazon Prime Video and funding from ICAA, the Madrid regional administration, and Ayuntamiento de Madrid. Filming began in mid February 2023.

Release 
The film will be distributed in Spain by Universal Pictures International Spain.

See also 
 List of Spanish films of 2023

References 

Upcoming Spanish-language films
Upcoming directorial debut films
Caballo Films films
Spanish horror films
French horror films
Argentine horror films